The Sibillini Mountains, or Sibylline Mountains (Italian: Monti Sibillini) are one of the major mountain groups of italic peninsula, part of Apennines mountain range.

Since 1993 the area has been part of the Parco Nazionale dei Monti Sibillini (Sibillini Mountains National Park).

The current morphology, largely dominated by U-shaped valleys and glacial depressions, is due to the action of glaciers in the Quaternary period.

Legend says that in a cave (today named the Sibyl cave), a necromancer who survived Christian persecutions against paganism at later Roman age, housed a male prophet who rarely revealed secrets of the future. Necromancers and knights, came from across Europe, after exhausting journeys trying to seize an oracle of Sybil.

Wildlife and vegetation
crested porcupine
eurasian eagle owl
golden eagle
peregrine falcon
roe deer
viper
wildcat
wolf

The small Lago di Pilato within a deep u-shaped valley below Monte Vettore, is home to a crustacean endemic of this location, the Chirocephalus marchesonii.

The area contains stands of beech scattered amongst open subalpine grasslands and meadows maintained by the grazing of sheep.

See also
Apennines
Geography of Italy

Sources

Mountain ranges of the Apennines
Sibillini
Sibillini
Sibillini